Qus Center, an Egyptian center located within the governorate of Qena in the Arab Republic of Egypt, is the largest center at the level of Upper Egypt, with an area of 40,862 acres, and at the end of 2020, the population of Al-Kasafah is 515,352 people.

References

External links 

Qus